Servant's Entrance (Swedish: Vi som går köksvägen) is a 1932 Swedish comedy film directed by Gustaf Molander and starring Carl Barcklind, Tutta Rolf and Bengt Djurberg.

The film's art direction was by Arne Åkermark.

Main cast
 Carl Barcklind as Adolf 
 Tutta Rolf as Helga Breder  
 Bengt Djurberg as Bertil Frigård  
 Emma Meissner as Mrs. Beck  
 Karin Swanström as Laura Persson, cook  
 Sigurd Wallén as Pontus  
 Tollie Zellman as Pontus' wife  
 Renée Björling as Astrid Beck  
 Anne-Marie Brunius as Ellen  
 Einar Fagstad as Bengtsson, teacher  
 Siegfried Fischer as Anders  
 Rut Holm as Olga, housemaid  
 Åke Ohberg as Joergen Beckman  
 Mathias Taube as Hans Breder
 Anna Olin as Aunt Alexandra

See also
 Servants' Entrance (1934)

References

Bibliography 
 Larsson, Mariah & Marklund, Anders (ed.). Swedish Film: An Introduction and Reader. Nordic Academic Press, 2010.

External links 
 

1932 films
Swedish comedy films
1932 comedy films
1930s Swedish-language films
Films directed by Gustaf Molander
Films based on Norwegian novels
Maids in films
Swedish black-and-white films
1930s Swedish films